

Events

Pre-1600
 275 – For the last time, the Roman Senate chooses an emperor; they elect 75-year-old Marcus Claudius Tacitus.
 762 – Led by Muhammad al-Nafs al-Zakiyya, the Hasanid branch of the Alids begins the Alid Revolt against the Abbasid Caliphate.
1066 – In the Battle of Stamford Bridge, Harald Hardrada, the invading King of Norway, is defeated by King Harold II of England.
1237 – England and Scotland sign the Treaty of York, establishing the location of their common border.
1396 – Ottoman Emperor Bayezid I defeats a Christian army at the Battle of Nicopolis.
1513 – Spanish explorer Vasco Núñez de Balboa reaches what would become known as the Pacific Ocean.
1555 – The Peace of Augsburg is signed by Emperor Charles V and the princes of the Schmalkaldic League.

1601–1900
1690 – Publick Occurrences Both Forreign and Domestick, the first newspaper to appear in the Americas, is published for the first and only time.
1768 – Unification of Nepal
1775 – American Revolution: Ethan Allen surrenders to British forces after attempting to capture Montreal during the Battle of Longue-Pointe.
  1775   – American Revolution: Benedict Arnold's expedition to Quebec sets off. 
1789 – The United States Congress passes twelve constitutional amendments: the ten known as the Bill of Rights, the (unratified) Congressional Apportionment Amendment, and the Congressional Compensation Amendment. 
1790 – Four Great Anhui Troupes introduce Anhui opera to Beijing in honor of the Qianlong Emperor's eightieth birthday.
1804 – The Teton Sioux (a subdivision of the Lakota) demand one of the boats from the Lewis and Clark Expedition as a toll for allowing the expedition to move further upriver.
1868 – The Imperial Russian steam frigate Alexander Nevsky is shipwrecked off Jutland while carrying Grand Duke Alexei Alexandrovich of Russia.
1890 – The United States Congress establishes Sequoia National Park.

1901–present
1906 – Leonardo Torres y Quevedo demonstrates the Telekino, guiding a boat from the shore, in what is considered to be the first use of a remote control.
1911 – An explosion of badly degraded propellant charges on board the French battleship Liberté detonates the forward ammunition magazines and destroys the ship.
1912 – Columbia University Graduate School of Journalism is founded in New York City.
1915 – World War I: The Second Battle of Champagne begins.
1918 – World War I: The end of the Battle of Megiddo, the climax of the British Army's Sinai and Palestine campaign under General Edmund Allenby.
1926 – The international Convention to Suppress the Slave Trade and Slavery is first signed.
1937 – Second Sino-Japanese War: The Chinese Eighth Route Army gains a minor, but morale-boosting victory in the Battle of Pingxingguan.
1944 – World War II: Surviving elements of the British 1st Airborne Division withdraw from Arnhem via Oosterbeek.
1955 – The Royal Jordanian Air Force is founded.
1956 – TAT-1, the first submarine transatlantic telephone cable system, is inaugurated.
1957 – Central High School in Little Rock, Arkansas, is integrated by the use of United States Army troops.
1959 – Solomon Bandaranaike, Prime Minister of Sri Lanka, is mortally wounded by a Buddhist monk, Talduwe Somarama, and dies the next day.
1962 – The People's Democratic Republic of Algeria is formally proclaimed. Ferhat Abbas is elected President of the provisional government.
  1962   – The North Yemen Civil War begins when Abdullah al-Sallal dethrones the newly crowned Imam al-Badr and declares Yemen a republic under his presidency.
1963 – Lord Denning releases the UK government's official report on the Profumo affair.
1964 – The Mozambican War of Independence against Portugal begins.
1969 – The charter establishing the Organisation of Islamic Cooperation is signed.
1974 – Dr. Frank Jobe performs first ulnar collateral ligament replacement surgery (better known as Tommy John surgery) on baseball player Tommy John.
1977 – About 4,200 people take part in the first running of the Chicago Marathon.
1978 – PSA Flight 182, a Boeing 727, collides in mid-air with a Cessna 172 and crashes in San Diego, killing all 135 aboard Flight 182, both occupants of the Cessna, as well as seven people on the ground. 
1981 – Belize joins the United Nations.
1983 – Thirty-eight IRA prisoners, armed with six handguns, hijack a prison meals lorry and smash their way out of the Maze Prison.
1987 – Fijian Governor-General Penaia Ganilau is overthrown in a coup d'état led by Lieutenant colonel Sitiveni Rabuka.
1992 – NASA launches the Mars Observer. Eleven months later, the probe would fail while preparing for orbital insertion.
1998 – PauknAir Flight 4101, a British Aerospace 146, crashes near Melilla Airport in Melilla, Spain, killing 38 people.
2003 – The 8.3  Hokkaidō earthquake strikes just offshore Hokkaidō, Japan.
2018 – Bill Cosby is sentenced to three to ten years in prison for aggravated sexual assault.

Births

Pre-1600
1358 – Ashikaga Yoshimitsu, Japanese shōgun (d. 1408)
1403 – Louis III of Anjou (d. 1434)
1525 – Steven Borough, English explorer and navigator (d. 1584)
1528 – Otto II, Duke of Brunswick-Harburg (d. 1603)
1529 – Günther XLI, Count of Schwarzburg-Arnstadt (d. 1583)
1599 – Francesco Borromini, Swiss-Italian architect, designed the San Carlo alle Quattro Fontane and Sant'Agnese in Agone (d. 1667)

1601–1900
1636 – Ferdinand Joseph, Prince of Dietrichstein, German prince (d. 1698)
1644 – Ole Rømer, Danish astronomer and instrument maker (d. 1710)
1663 – Johann Nikolaus Hanff, German organist and composer (d. 1711)
1683 – Jean-Philippe Rameau, French composer and theorist (d. 1764)
1694 – Henry Pelham, English politician, Prime Minister of the United Kingdom (d. 1754)
1711 – Qianlong Emperor of China (d. 1799)
1738 – Nicholas Van Dyke, American lawyer and politician, 7th Governor of Delaware (d. 1789)
1741 – Wenzel Pichl, Czech violinist, composer, and director (d. 1805)
1744 – Frederick William II of Prussia (d. 1797)
1758 – Josepha Barbara Auernhammer, Austrian pianist and composer (d. 1820)
1761 – William Mullins, 2nd Baron Ventry, Anglo-Irish politician and peer (d. 1827)
1764 – Fletcher Christian, English sailor (d. 1793)
1766 – Armand-Emmanuel de Vignerot du Plessis, Duc de Richelieu, French general and politician, 2nd Prime Minister of France (d. 1822)
1771 – Nikolay Raevsky, Russian general and politician (d. 1829)
1773 – Agostino Bassi, Italian entomologist and author (d. 1856)
1782 – Charles Maturin, Irish author and playwright (d. 1824)
1798 – Jean-Baptiste Élie de Beaumont, French geologist and engineer (d. 1874)
1816 – Georg August Rudolph, German lawyer and politician, 3rd Mayor of Marburg (d. 1893)
1825 – William Pitt Ballinger, American lawyer and politician (d. 1888)
  1825   – Joachim Heer, Swiss lawyer and politician, President of the National Council (d. 1879)
1839 – Karl Alfred von Zittel, German palaeontologist and geologist (d. 1904)
1862 – Léon Boëllmann, French organist and composer (d. 1897)
  1862   – Billy Hughes, English-Australian carpenter and politician, 7th Prime Minister of Australia (d. 1952)
1865 – Henri Lebasque, French artist (d. 1937)
1866 – Thomas Hunt Morgan, American biologist, geneticist, and embryologist, Nobel Prize laureate (d. 1945)
1867 – Yevgeny Miller, Russian general (d. 1938)
1877 – Plutarco Elías Calles, Mexican general and President (d. 1945)
1879 – Lope K. Santos, Filipino lawyer and politician, 4th Governor of Rizal (d. 1963)
1881 – Lu Xun, Chinese author and critic (d. 1936)
1884 – Adolf Bolm, Russian ballet dancer and choreographer (d. 1951)
1888 – Hanna Ralph, German actress (d. 1978)
1889 – Charles Kenneth Scott Moncrieff, Scottish author and translator (d. 1930)
1893 – Harald Cramér, Swedish mathematician and statistician (d. 1985)
1896 – Sandro Pertini, Italian journalist and politician, 7th President of Italy (d. 1990)
1897 – William Faulkner, American novelist and short story writer, Nobel Prize laureate (d. 1962)
1898 – Robert Brackman, Ukrainian-American painter and educator (d. 1980)
1899 – Udumalai Narayana Kavi, Indian poet and songwriter (d. 1981)
1900 – Artur Sirk, Estonian soldier, lawyer, and politician (d. 1937)

1901–present
1901 – Robert Bresson, French director and screenwriter (d. 1999)
  1901   – Gordon Coventry, Australian footballer (d. 1968)
1903 – Mark Rothko, Latvian-American painter and educator (d. 1970)
1906 – Volfgangs Dārziņš, Latvian composer, pianist, and music critic (d. 1962)
  1906   – Phyllis Pearsall, English painter, cartographer, and author (d. 1996)
  1906   – Dmitri Shostakovich, Russian pianist and composer (d. 1975)
1908 – Jacqueline Audry, French director and screenwriter (d. 1977)
1910 – Ralph Jordan, American football player and coach (d. 1980)
1911 – Eric Williams, Trinidadian historian and politician, 1st Prime Minister of Trinidad and Tobago (d. 1981)
1914 – John Manners, English naval officer and cricketer (d. 2020)
1916 – Jessica Anderson, Australian author and playwright (d. 2010)
  1916   – Deendayal Upadhyaya, Indian economist, sociologist, and journalist (d. 1968)
1917 – Phil Rizzuto, American baseball player and sportscaster (d. 2007)
1920 – Sergei Bondarchuk, Ukrainian-Russian actor, director, and screenwriter (d. 1994)
  1920   – Satish Dhawan, Indian engineer (d. 2002)
1921 – Rob Muldoon, New Zealand sergeant, accountant, and politician, 31st Prime Minister of New Zealand (d. 1992)
1922 – Hammer DeRoburt, Nauruian educator and politician, 1st President of Nauru (d. 1992)
1923 – Robert Laxalt, American author and academic (d. 2001)
  1923   – Sam Rivers, American saxophonist, clarinet player, and composer (d. 2011)
1924 – Norman Ayrton, English actor and director (d. 2017)
  1924   – Red Webb, American baseball player (d. 1996)
1925 – Silvana Pampanini, Italian model, actress, and director, Miss Italy 1946 (d. 2016)
1926 – Jack Hyles, American pastor and author (d. 2001)
  1926   – Aldo Ray, American actor (d. 1991)
1927 – Carl Braun, American basketball player and coach (d. 2010)
  1927   – Colin Davis, English conductor and educator (d. 2013)
1929 – Ronnie Barker, English actor and screenwriter (d. 2005)
  1929   – Delia Scala, Italian ballerina and actress (d. 2004)
  1929   – Barbara Walters, American journalist, producer, and author (d. 2022)
1930 – Nino Cerruti, Italian fashion designer, founded Cerruti (d. 2022)
  1930   – Shel Silverstein, American author, poet, illustrator, and songwriter (d. 1999)
1931 – Manouchehr Atashi, Iranian journalist and poet (d. 2005)
  1931   – Bryan John Birch, English mathematician and scholar
1932 – Glenn Gould, Canadian pianist and composer (d. 1982)
  1932   – Terry Medwin, Welsh footballer and manager
  1932   – Adolfo Suárez, Spanish lawyer and politician, 1st Prime Minister of Spain (d. 2014)
1933 – Hubie Brown, American basketball player, coach, and sportscaster
  1933   – Ian Tyson, Canadian folk singer-songwriter and musician (d. 2022)
1936 – Ken Forsse, American toy creator and author, created Teddy Ruxpin (d. 2014)
  1936   – Juliet Prowse, South African-American actress, singer, and dancer (d. 1996)
  1936   – Moussa Traoré, Malian general and politician 2nd President of Mali (d. 2020)
1937 – Mary Allen Wilkes, American computer scientist and lawyer
1938 – Ron Hill, English runner and businessman (d. 2021)
  1938   – Jonathan Motzfeldt, Greenlandic priest and politician, 1st Prime Minister of Greenland (d. 2010)
  1938   – Enn Tarto, Estonian politician (d. 2021)
1939 – Leon Brittan, English lawyer and politician, Secretary of State for Business, Innovation and Skills (d. 2015)
  1939   – Feroz Khan, Indian actor, director, and producer (d. 2009)
  1939   – David S. Mann, American lawyer and politician, Mayor of Cincinnati
1940 – Tim Severin, Indian-English explorer, historian, and author (d. 2020)
1941 – Vivien Stern, Baroness Stern, English academic and politician
1942 – Oscar Bonavena, Argentinian boxer (d. 1976)
  1942   – Robert Miano, American actor and producer
  1942   – Henri Pescarolo, French race car driver
  1942   – John Taylor, English pianist and educator (d. 2015)
  1942   – Dee Dee Warwick, American singer (d. 2008)
1943 – Robert Gates, American lieutenant, academic, and politician, 22nd United States Secretary of Defense
  1943   – John Locke, American keyboard player (d. 2006)
  1943   – Aram Saroyan, American poet and novelist
  1943   – Robert Walden, American actor, director, and screenwriter
1944 – Michael Douglas, American actor and producer
  1944   – Doris Matsui, American politician
  1944   – Grayson Shillingford, Dominican cricketer (d. 2009)
1945 – Kathleen Brown, American lawyer and politician, 29th California State Treasurer
  1945   – Carol Vadnais, Canadian ice hockey player and coach (d. 2014)
1946 – Bishan Singh Bedi, Indian cricketer and coach
  1946   – Felicity Kendal, English actress
  1946   – Bryan MacLean, American singer-songwriter, guitarist, and producer (d. 1998)
  1946   – Janusz Majer, Polish mountaineer
  1946   – Gil Morgan, American golfer
  1946   – Ali Parvin, Iranian footballer
  1946   – Jerry Penrod, American bass player 
1947 – Giannos Kranidiotis, Greek politician and diplomat (d. 1999)
  1947   – Cheryl Tiegs, American model and actress
  1947   – Cecil Womack, American singer-songwriter and producer (d. 2013)
1948 – Mimi Kennedy, American actress and screenwriter
  1948   – Vasile Șirli, Romanian musical composer and producer
  1948   – Vladimir Yevtushenkov, Russian businessman
1949 – Pedro Almodóvar, Spanish director, producer, and screenwriter
  1949   – Jeff Borowiak, American tennis player
  1949   – Steve Mackay, American saxophonist and composer (d. 2015)
1950 – Stanisław Szozda, Polish cyclist and trainer (d. 2013)
1951 – Yardena Arazi, Israeli singer
  1951   – Burleigh Drummond, American drummer and songwriter 
  1951   – Graeme Knowles, English bishop
  1951   – Mark Hamill, American actor, singer, and producer
  1951   – Bob McAdoo, American basketball player and coach
1952 – Colin Friels, Scottish-Australian actor
  1952   – Jimmy Garvin, American wrestler and manager
  1952   – bell hooks, American author and activist (d. 2021)
  1952   – Cherríe Moraga, American poet, playwright, and activist 
  1952   – Tommy Norden, American actor
  1952   – Chris Pond, English politician
  1952   – Christopher Reeve, American actor, producer, and activist (d. 2004)
1953 – Richard Harvey, English mandolin player, keyboard player, and composer 
  1953   – Ron Rash, American novelist, short story writer, poet 
  1954   – Sylvester Croom, American football player and coach
  1954   – Joep Lange, Dutch physician and academic (d. 2014)
  1954   – Juande Ramos, Spanish footballer and manager
1955 – Ludo Coeck, Belgian footballer (d. 1985)
  1955   – Zucchero Fornaciari, Italian singer-songwriter and guitarist
  1955   – Amyr Klink, Brazilian sailor and explorer 
  1955   – Luanne Rice, American author and activist
  1955   – Karl-Heinz Rummenigge, German footballer and manager
  1955   – Steven Severin, English bass player, songwriter, and producer 
1956 – W. Daniel Hillis, American computer scientist, engineer, and author, founded the Thinking Machines Corporation
  1956   – Jamie Hyneman, American special effects designer and television host, founded M5 Industries
  1956   – Miroslav Volf, Croatian Protestant theologian and public intellectual
1957 – Michael Madsen, American actor and producer
  1957   – Vladimir Popovkin, Russian general (d. 2014)
1958 – Randy Kerber, American keyboard player, composer, and conductor
1959 – Jeon Soo-il, South Korean director, producer, and screenwriter
1960 – Igor Belanov, Ukrainian footballer and manager
1961 – Mehmet Aslantuğ, Turkish actor, director, producer, and screenwriter
  1961   – Heather Locklear, American actress 
  1961   – Steve Scott, British journalist and presenter
  1961   – Tim Zoehrer, Australian cricketer
1962 – Kalthoum Sarrai, Tunisian-French psychologist and journalist (d. 2010)
  1962   – Aida Turturro, American actress
  1962   – Dariusz Wdowczyk, Polish footballer and coach
1963 – Tate Donovan, American actor 
  1963   – Keely Shaye Smith, American journalist and author
1964 – Gary Ayles, English race car driver
  1964   – Barbara Dennerlein, German organist
  1964   – Rebecca Gablé, German novelist
  1964   – Kikuko Inoue, Japanese singer-songwriter and voice actress 
  1964   – Joey Saputo, Canadian businessman 
1965 – Matt Battaglia, American football player, actor, and producer
  1965   – Saffron Henderson, Canadian voice actress and singer
  1965   – Scottie Pippen, American basketball player and sportscaster
  1965   – Anne Roumanoff, French actress and screenwriter
  1965   – Dave Rundle, South African cricketer
  1965   – Rob Schmidt, American director and screenwriter
  1965   – Rafael Martín Vázquez, Spanish footballer and coach
  1965   – Nicky Winmar, Australian footballer
1966 – Stanislav Bunin, Russian pianist and educator
  1966   – Todd Philcox, American football player
1967 – Kim Issel, Canadian ice hockey player
  1967   – Ashwin Sood, English-Canadian drummer and producer
1968 – John A. List, American economist and academic
  1968   – Will Smith, American actor, producer, and rapper 
  1968   – John Worsfold, Australian footballer and coach
1969 – Hansie Cronje, South African cricketer (d. 2002)
  1969   – Bill Simmons, American journalist and author
 1969    – Hal Sparks, American actor, comedian, musician and political commentator
  1969   – Tony Womack, American baseball player
  1969   – Catherine Zeta-Jones, Welsh actress 
1970 – Curtis Buckley, American football player and psychiatrist
1971 – Nikos Boudouris, Greek basketball player and manager
  1971   – John Lynch, American football player and sportscaster
  1971   – Seb Sanders, English jockey
1972 – Douglas September, Canadian singer-songwriter, guitarist, and producer
1973 – Tijani Babangida, Nigerian footballer
  1973   – Jenny Chapman, English politician
1974 – Bill Bowler, Canadian ice hockey player and coach
  1974   – Olivier Dacourt, French footballer
  1974   – John Granville, American scholar and diplomat (d. 2008)
  1974   – Paul Hurst, English footballer and manager
  1974   – Daniel Kessler, English-American singer and guitarist 
  1974   – Frank Leder, German fashion designer
  1974   – Robbie Mears, Australian rugby league player and coach
  1974   – Eric Moss, American football player (d. 2019)
  1974   – Joel Prpic, Canadian ice hockey player
  1974   – Javier Rosas, Mexican triathlete
  1974   – Kemel Thompson, Jamaican hurdler 
1975 – Daniela Ceccarelli, Italian skier
  1975   – Declan Donnelly, English entertainer 
  1975   – Matt Hasselbeck, American football player
  1975   – Dat Nguyen, American football player and coach
1976 – Santigold, American singer-songwriter and producer 
  1976   – Chauncey Billups, American basketball player
  1976   – Eric Roberson, American singer-songwriter and producer
  1976   – Charlotte Ayanna, Puerto Rican American actress
1977 – Clea DuVall, American actress
  1977   – Joel David Moore, American actor
  1977   – Mike Krahulik, American illustrator
  1977   – Wil Nieves, Puerto Rican-American baseball player
1978 – Joe Cotton, Canadian-New Zealand singer 
  1978   – Roudolphe Douala, Cameroonian footballer
  1978   – Ricardo Gardner, Jamaican footballer
  1978   – Jodie Kidd, English model and actress
  1978   – Ryan Leslie, American singer-songwriter and producer
  1978   – Joel Piñeiro, Puerto Rican baseball player
1979 – Kyle Bennett, American BMX rider (d. 2012)
  1979   – Rashad Evans, American mixed martial artist and wrestler
  1979   – Jason Koumas, Welsh footballer
  1979   – Jean-René Lisnard, French tennis player
1980 – T.I., American rapper, songwriter, producer, and actor
1981 – Rocco Baldelli, American baseball player
  1981   – Jason Bergmann, American baseball player
1982 – Hyun Bin, South Korean actor
1983 – Donald Glover, American actor, rapper, producer, and screenwriter
  1983   – Terrance Pennington, American football player
1984 – Cherine Anderson, Jamaican singer-songwriter and actress 
  1984   – Matías Silvestre, Argentinian footballer
1985 – Gökhan Güleç, Turkish footballer
  1985   – Marvin Matip, German footballer
1986 – Heidi El Tabakh, Egyptian-Canadian tennis player
  1986   – Jamie O'Hara, English footballer
  1986   – Marten Strauch, German rugby player
  1986   – Steve Forrest, American drummer 
  1986   – Choi Yoon-young, South Korean actress
1987 – Monica Niculescu, Romanian tennis player
  1987   – Mustafa Yumlu, Turkish footballer 
1989 – Cuco Martina, Curaçaoan footballer
  1989   – Aldon Smith, American football player
1990 – Mao Asada, Japanese figure skater
  1990   – Daria Strokous, Russian model, actress, and photographer
1991 – Emmy Clarke, American actress
  1991   – Alessandro Crescenzi, Italian footballer
  1991   – Calle Järnkrok, Swedish ice hockey player
1992 – Zoël Amberg, Swiss race car driver
  1992   – Kerrod Holland, Australian rugby league player 
  1992   – Massimo Luongo, Australian footballer
  1992   – Keauna McLaughlin, American figure skater
  1992   – Ruslan Zhiganshin, Russian ice dancer
1993 – Toby Greene, Australian footballer
1995 – Todd Hazelwood, Australian race car driver
1996 – Anett Vilipuu, Estonian footballer
1996     – Yue Yuan, Chinese tennis player

Deaths

Pre-1600
1066 – Harald Hardrada, Norwegian king (b. 1015)
  1066   – Maria Haraldsdotter, Norwegian princess
  1066   – Tostig Godwinson, English son of Godwin, Earl of Wessex (b. c. 1029)
1086 – William VIII, Duke of Aquitaine (b. 1025)
1087 – Simon I de Montfort, French nobleman (b. c. 1025)
1333 – Prince Morikuni, Japanese shōgun (b. 1301)
1367 – Jakushitsu Genkō, Japanese poet (b. 1290)
1396 – Jean de Carrouges, French knight (b. 1330)
  1396   – Jean de Vienne, French general and admiral (b. 1341)
1496 – Piero Capponi, Italian soldier and politician (b. 1447)
1506 – Philip I of Castile (b. 1478)
1534 – Pope Clement VII (b. 1478)
1536 – Johannes Secundus, Dutch author and poet (b. 1511)
1550 – Georg von Blumenthal, German bishop (b. 1490)
1588 – Tilemann Heshusius, German Gnesio-Lutheran theologian (b. 1527)

1601–1900
1602 – Caspar Peucer, German physician, scholar, and reformer (b. 1525)
1615 – Arbella Stuart, English noblewoman and woman of letters (b. 1575)
1617 – Emperor Go-Yōzei of Japan (b. 1572)
  1617   – Francisco Suárez, Spanish priest, philosopher, and theologian (b. 1548)
1621 – Mary Sidney, English writer (b. 1561)
1626 – Lancelot Andrewes, English bishop and scholar (b. 1555)
1630 – Ambrogio Spinola, 1st Marquis of the Balbases, Italian general and politician, Governor of the Duchy of Milan (b. 1569)
1665 – Archduchess Maria Anna of Austria (b. 1610)
1703 – Archibald Campbell, 1st Duke of Argyll, Scottish general (b. 1658)
1774 – John Bradstreet, Canadian-English general (b. 1714)
1777 – Johann Heinrich Lambert, Swiss mathematician, physicist, and astronomer (b. 1728)
1791 – William Bradford, American soldier and publisher (b. 1719)
1792 – Adam Gottlob Moltke, Danish politician and diplomat (b. 1710)
1794 – Paul Rabaut, French pastor (b. 1718)
1828 – Charlotta Seuerling, Swedish singer, harpsichord player, and composer (b. 1783)
1849 – Johann Strauss I, Austrian composer (b. 1804)
1867 – Oliver Loving, American rancher, co-developed the Goodnight–Loving Trail (b. 1812)
1893 – Louise von François, German author (b. 1817)
1900 – Félix-Gabriel Marchand, Canadian journalist and politician, 11th Premier of Québec (b. 1832)
  1900   – John M. Palmer, American general and politician, 15th Governor of Illinois (b. 1817)

1901–present
1901 – Arthur Fremantle, English general and politician, Governor of Malta (b. 1835)
1905 – Jacques Marie Eugène Godefroy Cavaignac, French educator and politician (b. 1853)
1917 – Thomas Ashe, Irish Republican Brotherhood volunteer and rebel commander. Died as a result of forced feeding while on hunger strike. (b. 1885) 
1918 – Mikhail Alekseyev, Russian general (b. 1857)
1926 – Herbert Booth, English songwriter and bandleader (b. 1862)
1928 – Richard F. Outcault, American cartoonist, created The Yellow Kid and Buster Brown (b. 1863)
1929 – Miller Huggins, American baseball player and manager (b. 1879)
1933 – Ring Lardner, American journalist and author (b. 1885)
1938 – Lev Zadov, Ukrainian intelligence agent (b. 1893)
1939 – Ali Saip Ursavaş, Turkish soldier and politician (b. 1885)
1941 – Foxhall P. Keene, American polo player, golfer, and race car driver (b. 1867)
1943 – Alexander Hall, Scottish-Canadian soccer player (b. 1880)
1946 – Hans Eppinger, Austrian physician (b. 1879)
1955 – Martha Norelius Swedish-born American swimmer (b. 1909)
1958 – John B. Watson, American psychologist and academic (b. 1878)
1960 – Emily Post, American author and educator (b. 1873)
1961 – Frank Fay, American actor and singer (b. 1897)
1968 – Hans F. K. Günther, German eugenicist and academic (b. 1891)
  1968   – Cornell Woolrich, American author and screenwriter (b. 1903)
1970 – Erich Maria Remarque, German-Swiss author and translator (b. 1898)
1971 – Hugo Black, American captain, jurist, and politician (b. 1886)
1980 – John Bonham, English drummer and songwriter (b. 1948)
  1980   – Lewis Milestone, Russian-American director, producer, and screenwriter (b. 1895)
  1980   – Marie Under, Estonian author and poet (b. 1883)
1983 – Leopold III of Belgium (b. 1901)
1984 – Walter Pidgeon, Canadian-American actor (b. 1897)
1986 – Darshan Singh Canadian, Indian-Canadian trade union leader and activist (b. 1917)
  1986   – Donald MacDonald, Canadian union leader and politician (b. 1909)
  1986   – Nikolay Semyonov, Russian physicist and chemist, Nobel Prize laureate (b. 1896)
  1986   – Hans Vogt, Norwegian linguist and academic (b. 1909)
1987 – Mary Astor, American actress (b. 1906)
  1987   – Emlyn Williams, Welsh actor and playwright (b. 1905)
1988 – Billy Carter, American farmer and businessman (b. 1937)
  1988   – Arthur Võõbus, Estonian-American orientalist and scholar (b. 1909)
1990 – Prafulla Chandra Sen, Indian accountant and politician, 3rd Chief Minister of West Bengal (b. 1897)
1991 – Klaus Barbie, German SS captain, known as the "Butcher of Lyon" (b. 1913)
  1991   – Viviane Romance, French actress and producer (b. 1912)
1992 – Ivan Vdović, Serbian musician (b. 1961)
1995 – Dave Bowen, Welsh footballer and manager (b. 1928)
  1995   – Annie Elizabeth Delany, American dentist and author (b. 1891)
1997 – Hélène Baillargeon, Canadian singer and actress (b. 1916)
  1997   – Jean Françaix, French pianist, composer, and conductor (b. 1912)
1999 – Marion Zimmer Bradley, American author (b. 1930)
2003 – Aqila al-Hashimi, Iraqi translator and politician (b. 1953)
  2003   – Herb Gardner, American director, producer, and screenwriter (b. 1934)
  2003   – Franco Modigliani, Italian-American economist and academic, Nobel Prize laureate (b. 1918)
  2003   – George Plimpton, American writer and literary editor (b. 1927)
2005 – Don Adams, American actor, director, and screenwriter (b. 1923)
  2005   – Madeline-Ann Aksich, Canadian businesswoman and philanthropist (b. 1956)
  2005   – George Archer, American golfer (b. 1939)
  2005   – Urie Bronfenbrenner, Russian-American psychologist and ecologist (b. 1917)
  2005   – Ghulam Mustafa Khan, Pakistani linguist and critic (b. 1912)
  2005   – M. Scott Peck, American psychiatrist and author (b. 1936)
  2005   – Friedrich Peter, Austrian lawyer and politician (b. 1921)
2006 – Jeff Cooper, American target shooter and author (b. 1920)
  2006   – John M. Ford, American author and poet (b. 1957)
2007 – Haidar Abdel-Shafi, Palestinian physician and politician (b. 1919)
 2007    – André Emmerich, German-American art dealer (b. 1924)
2008 – Derog Gioura, Nauruan politician, 23rd President of Nauru (b. 1932)
2009 – Alicia de Larrocha, Spanish pianist (b. 1923)
  2009   – Pierre Falardeau, Canadian actor, director, and screenwriter (b. 1946)
2011 – Wangari Maathai, Kenyan environmentalist and activist, Nobel Prize laureate (b. 1940)
2012 – Billy Barnes, American composer and songwriter (b. 1927)
  2012   – John Bond, English footballer and manager (b. 1923)
  2012   – Eric Ives, English historian and academic (b. 1931)
  2012   – Alonso Lujambio, Mexican academic and politician (b. 1962)
  2012   – Andy Williams, American singer (b. 1927)
2013 – Ron Fenton, English footballer, coach, and manager (b. 1940)
  2013   – Choi In-ho, South Korean author and screenwriter (b. 1945)
  2013   – José Montoya, American poet and academic (b. 1932)
  2013   – Billy Mure, American guitarist and composer (b. 1915)
  2013   – Pablo Verani, Italian-Argentinian lawyer and politician (b. 1938)
  2013   – Bennet Wong, Canadian psychiatrist and academic, co-founded Haven Institute (b. 1930)
2014 – Ulrick Chérubin, Haitian-Canadian educator and politician (b. 1943)
  2014   – Sulejman Tihić, Bosnian lawyer, judge, and politician (b. 1951)
  2014   – Dorothy Tyler-Odam, English high jumper (b. 1920)
2015 – Claudio Baggini, Italian Roman Catholic prelate (b. 1936)
  2015   – John Galvin, American general (b. 1929)
  2015   – Tom Kelley, American baseball player and manager (b. 1944)
  2015   – Moti Kirschenbaum, Israeli journalist (b. 1939)
2016 – José Fernández, Cuban-American baseball player (b. 1992)
  2016   – Arnold Palmer, American golfer (b. 1929)
  2016   – Nahid Hattar, Jordanian writer and political activist (b. 1960)

Holidays and observances
Armed Forces Day or Revolution Day (Mozambique)
Christian feast day:
Abadir and Iraja and Companions (Coptic Church)
Aunarius (Aunacharius)
Anathalon (Archdiocese of Milan)
Cadoc
Ceolfrith
Cleopas
Euphrosyne of Alexandria
Finbarr
Fermin of Amiens
Lancelot Andrewes (Church of England)
Sergius of Radonezh (repose)
Vincent Strambi
September 25 (Eastern Orthodox liturgics)
Day of National Recognition for the Harkis (France) 
National Research Administrators Day (United States)
National Youth Day (Nauru)

References

External links

 
 
 

Days of the year
September